The R571 is a Regional Route in South Africa.

Route
Its northern origin is the Crocodile Bridge gate of the Kruger National Park. From there it heads south to Komatipoort where it crosses the N4 at a staggered intersection. It continues south to Mananga Border Post, whereafter it enters Eswatini as the MR5.

References

Regional Routes in Mpumalanga